Una mujer marcada is a Mexican telenovela produced by Ernesto Alonso for Televisa in 1979.

Cast 
Sasha Montenegro as Lorena / Loraine Montiel
Martin Cortés as Gino Valenti
Isabela Corona as Sofía
María Eugenia Ríos as Gloria
Jorge Mondragón as Don Ramón
Miguel Palmer as Aldo
Alfonso Meza as Fernando
Agustín Sauret as Joe
Lucha Altamirano as Balbina
Eduardo Alcaraz as Franco
Mónica Sánchez Navarro as Lucero
Eugenia Avendaño as Alejandra

References

External links 

Mexican telenovelas
1979 telenovelas
Televisa telenovelas
Spanish-language telenovelas
1979 Mexican television series debuts
1979 Mexican television series endings